The following ships of the Royal Danish Navy have borne the name HDMS Flora:

 , a corvette in service 1826–1856
  a submarine launched in 1920 and scrapped in 1952
  a  launched in 1955 and decommissioned in 1978

References

Royal Danish Navy ship names